The 1969–70 WCHL season was the fourth season of the Western Canada Hockey League (WCHL). Eight teams completed a 60-game season, with the Flin Flon Bombers winning their second consecutive President's Cup.

League business
The WCHL annual meeting was scheduled from June 20 to 22 in Saskatoon, but was postponed until June 19 to 21 in Calgary, due to lack of accommodation in Saskatoon. The WCHL planned to operate the 1969–70 season with the same eight teams from the previous season. Twenty players from the WCHL were chosen in the 1969 NHL amateur draft. Since the WCHL was operating under the jurisdiction of the Canadian Hockey Association instead of the Canadian Amateur Hockey Association (CAHA), league president Ron Butlin initiated legal action for draft payments made by the National Hockey League (NHL) to the CAHA. The WCHL reached a gate receipt sharing plan, where larger cities would assist the smaller cities in the WCHL.

A tentative agreement was announced on July 30, 1969, where the WCHL would rejoin the CAHA. According to the agreement, the WCHL would not expand this season and it was too late to have representation on the CAHA's junior committee. There were no plans for the WCHL to participate in the 1970 Memorial Cup. Outstanding fees from the NHL draft would be paid out, and WCHL teams would not deal directly with the NHL. WCHL teams were allowed to claim a maximum of one player from lower-tier CAHA teams. The WCHL still wanted to reserve the right to place a club anywhere in Western Canada without seeking CAHA approval. The tentative agreement had not been approved by the CAHA as of September 16, 1969, and the WCHL had still not accepted the terms of the agreement as of September 29, 1969.

Butlin stated that peace talks with the CAHA had stopped due to financial issues, and the league would begin its season outside of CAHA jurisdiction. He stated that the WCHL wanted the development fees released to its teams immediately, whereas the CAHA reportedly wanted to hold the money as a bond in good faith until May 1970. CAHA president Earl Dawson granted an extension until October 8, 1969, for the WCHL to decide. A joint meeting with the NHL was refused since the professionals deems it was an amateur issue only. Dawson terminated negotiations on October 9, but individual teams in the WCHL were still welcomed to apply for CAHA membership. WCHL teams were reportedly offered $5,000 per team in subsidies from the CAHA, but had asked for the same $7,000 given to teams in the Ontario Hockey Association (OHA). After it was apparent the WCHL would not rejoin the CAHA, the WCHL and the OHA began to compete for players from each other's league. On October 17, 1969, the WCHL resumed legal action to recover development payments from the NHL made to the CAHA.

The Western Ontario Junior A Hockey League wanted to continue the east-west Canadian Hockey Association final series, and felt that their teams were stronger than previous season due to more over-age players on its rosters who had previously played in the OHA. Butlin was hesitant to agree due to last year's final being incomplete and WCHL teams were concerned about the imbalance of talent. 

The Winnipeg Free Press reported that Butlin would agree to let WCHL players participate on the Canada men's national ice hockey team when the 1970 Ice Hockey World Championships were scheduled to be hosted in Canada. After Canada withdrew from international play and hosting the 1970 Ice Hockey World Championships, Butlin gave permission for WCHL teams to sign former players of the Canadian national team, providing that players had fulfilled all contractual obligations. He later retracted that permission since the WCHL constitution did not allow players to be signed after February 10, for any reason.

The Medicine Hat Tigers were accepted as a new team for the 1970–71 WCHL season. Butlin attempted to expand the WCHL westward into British Columbia, and invited the Victoria Cougars of the British Columbia Junior Hockey League to join. He also wanted to see teams in Vancouver and New Westminster. Team owners in Victoria made it known publicly they were interested in the WCHL, as did ownership of the Vancouver Centennials. Westward expansion faced skepticism by some team owners in established cities due to the lower calibre of the new teams, and more time away from the players' schooling to travel further.

A meeting in March 1970 between the WCHL and the CAHA to resolve all differences ended after just 15 minutes. Butlin reported that the WCHL was asked to accept the same conditions as any other junior league under CAHA jurisdiction, instead of recognizing the existing grievances. The main issues between the WCHL and the CAHA were, transfer of players between provinces, the number of over-age players per team, development fees from the NHL, subsidy from the CAHA for operational costs, a guaranteed berth in the Memorial Cup final, sharing of profits from playoffs, and the right to relocate any franchise without CAHA approval.

Regular season

Final standings

Scoring leaders
Note: GP = Games played; G = Goals; A = Assists; Pts = Points; PIM = Penalties in minutes

League playoffs

Quarterfinals
Flin Flon defeated Brandon 4 games to 0
Winnipeg defeated Estevan 4 games to 1
Edmonton defeated Swift Current 4 games to 1
Calgary defeated Saskatoon 4 games to 3

Semifinals
Flin Flon defeated Winnipeg 5 games to 4
Edmonton defeated Calgary 4 games to 3 (2 ties)

Finals
Flin Flon defeated Edmonton 4 games to 0

All-Star game

The 1969–70 WCHL all-star game was held in Edmonton, Alberta, with the WCHL All-stars defeating the Edmonton Oil Kings 7–2 before a crowd of 4,753.

Awards

All-star team
Goaltender: Ray Martyniuk, Flin Flon Bombers
Defenceman: Jim Hargreaves, Winnipeg Jets
Defenceman: Murray Anderson, Flin Flon Bombers
Centerman: Chris Oddleifson, Winnipeg Jets
Left winger: Greg Polis, Estevan Bruins
Right winger: Reggie Leach, Flin Flon Bombers

See also
1969 in sports
1970 in sports

Notes

References

External links
whl.ca

Western Hockey League seasons
WCHL